Tony McConkey (born November 21, 1963) is a former elected official in the Maryland House of Delegates. He was first elected in 2002, taking the seat of former Delegate Janet Greenip, who ran for a State Senate seat. He served in District 33, which is located in Anne Arundel County, Maryland. He lost a bid for re-election in 2018 to Democratic challenger Heather Bagnall.

Early years/education
Born in Cheverly, Maryland, he graduated in 1986 from the University of Maryland, College Park with a joint B.A. (government & politics) and B.S. (business management) degree. He attended the University of Maryland School of Law, graduating with a J.D. in 1990.

Career

As a member of the Republican Party in the Maryland House of Delegates, he served as Ranking Member on the House Appropriations Committee. McConkey fought in March 2007 to allow for an elected school board in Anne Arundel County. However, a bill was passed that allowed the Governor to select the members from a list. McConkey and Warren Miller were the only dissenting votes.

Another issue that McConkey advocated for was limiting privileges for illegal immigrants. He co-sponsored a bill in the House, similar to the one submitted by State Senator Janet Greenip to require driver's license applicants to prove they are citizens of the United States. Currently, Maryland is one of several states that does not demand proof of citizenship to obtain a driver's license.

McConkey was a real estate broker. In 2010, he pleaded guilty to violating laws that protect homeowners during foreclosure and lost his real estate licence and was ordered by a judge to pay $75,000. He has sought to have his license restored.

McConkey's disbarment as an attorney in the state of Maryland is on record with the Maryland Court System.

In 2013, he was reprimanded by the House for introducing legislation that would have personally benefited him.

On November 8, 2018, McConkey was defeated by Heather Bagnall, a Democrat, for Delegate in District 33A by less than 1 percentage point (185 vote margin).

Legislative notes
voted against the Clean Indoor Air Act of 2007 (HB359)
 voted against in-state tuition for illegal immigrants in 2007 (HB6)
 voted for the Healthy Air Act in 2006 (SB154)
 voted against slots in 2005 (HB1361)

Election results 
2006 Race for Maryland House of Delegates – 33rd District, Division A
Voters to choose two:
{| class="wikitable"
|-
!Name
!Votes
!Percent
!Outcome
|- 
|James King, Rep.
|18,542
|  29.0%
|   Won
|-
|Tony McConkey, Rep.
|16,655
|  26.0%
|   Won
|-
|Patricia Weathersbee, Dem.
|15,226
|  23.8%
|   Lost
|-
|Paul G. Rudolph, Dem.
|13,461
|  21.0%
|   Lost
|-
|Other Write-Ins 
|73
|  0.1%
|   
|}

2002 Race for Maryland House of Delegates – 33rd District, Division A
Voters to choose two:
{| class="wikitable"
|-
!Name
!Votes
!Percent
!Outcome
|-
|David Boschert, Rep.
|20,279
|  33.0%
|   Won
|- 
|Tony McConkey Rep.
|16,157
|  26.3%
|   Won
|-
|Jim Snider, Dem.
|11,427
|  18.6%
|   Lost
|-
|Steve Rizzi, Dem.
|10,939
|  17.8%
|   Lost
|-
|Michael Anthony Lagana, Unaffiliated
|2,622
|  4.3%
|   Lost
|-
|Other Write-Ins
|31
|  0.1%
|   
|}

1998 Race for Maryland House of Delegates – 30th District
Voters to choose three:
{| class="wikitable"
|-
!Name
!Votes
!Percent
!Outcome
|- 
|Michael E. Busch Dem.
|24,075
|  21%
|   Won
|-
|Virginia P. Clagett, Dem.
|24,036
|  21%
|   Won
|-
|Richard D'Amato, Dem.
|20,223
|  18%
|   Won
|-
|Phillip D. Bissett, Rep.
|18,690
|  16%
|   Lost
|-
|Anthony McConkey, Rep.
|12,353
|  11%
|   Lost
|-
|Edward J. Turner, Rep.
|14,119
|  12%
|   Lost
|}

1994 Race for Maryland House of Delegates – District 22A
Voters to choose two:
{| class="wikitable"
|-
!Name
!Votes
!Percent
!Outcome
|- 
|Anne Healey Dem.
|8,475
|  31%
|   Won
|-
|Richard A. Palumbo, Dem.
|9,246
|  34%
|   Won
|-
|Anthony McConkey, Rep.
|5,584
|  20%
|   Lost
|-
|Keith L. Poptanich, Rep.
|3,989
|  15%
|   Lost
|}

References

External links
 

1963 births
Living people
People from Cheverly, Maryland
Republican Party members of the Maryland House of Delegates
People from Anne Arundel County, Maryland
People from Severna Park, Maryland
21st-century American politicians